Alberta Provincial Highway No. 501, commonly referred to as Highway 501, is a highway in the province of Alberta, Canada.  It runs west–east from Highway 5 east of Mountain View as gravel to Cardston, then pavement through Del Bonita and Milk River to Highway 879, then gravel again to the Saskatchewan border.

It is also known as 9 Avenue in Cardston, and Centre Avenue in Milk River. From Highway 889, on through to Saskatchewan, it follows the path of the Red Coat Trail.

The section of Highway 501 between Cardston and the ghost town of Whiskey Gap was originally designated as part of Highway 40, where Highway 40 continued south to the Canada–United States border. The Highway 40 designation was removed in the early 1970s.

Cardston bypass 
The Cardston truck bypass is officially designated as part of Highway 501 but it unsigned. The signed designation follows 9th Avenue through Cardston, and then follows a short concurrency with Highway 2.

Major intersections 
From west to east:

References 

501